Jarryd James Klapper (born December 1984, in Brisbane) is an Australian singer, songwriter and record producer who performs as Jarryd James. He released his debut single "Do You Remember" on 30 January 2015, which peaked at No. 2 on the ARIA Singles Chart. His debut album, Thirty One, also reached No. 2 on the related ARIA Albums Chart. At the ARIA Music Awards of 2015, James won Best Pop Release for "Do You Remember".

Career

2007–2018: Beginnings and Thirty One
Jarryd first enjoyed moderate success from playing guitar and singing in a band called Holland. They recorded a debut album that was never released for mysterious reasons. Jarryd claimed he was frustrated and that their album never arrived on store shelves due to 'management issues'. James quit making music around 2012 due to the issues surrounding the release of Holland's album.

James supported Broods on their late 2014 tour, and Angus & Julia Stone on their February 2015 tour. His breakthrough came in early 2015 when his debut solo single “Do You Remember” climbed the charts. His debut headline tour commenced in April 2015 in Melbourne, Sydney and Brisbane. After the debut headline tour sold out, another tour in larger venues was confirmed for July 2015.

On 24 July 2015, James announced the title of his debut studio album, Thirty One. It was released on 11 September 2015 and debuted at number 2 on the ARIA Albums Chart. In the United States, a shortened Extended Play was released, with the album "Thirty One" scheduled for a January 2016 release. At the ARIA Music Awards of 2015 James won Best Pop Release for "Do You Remember" and received four further nominations.

On 18 June 2016, James released the single "1000×" with New Zealand band, Broods. James supported Broods on their 2014 tour, and both have music produced by Joel Little. On 12 October 2018, James released his cover of Logan Lynn’s “Nothing’s Ever Wrong” as part of Lynn’s multi-media double album My Movie Star, produced by Jay Mohr.

2019–present: P.M.
In January 2019, James released "Slow Motion", the lead single from his second studio album, P.M., released on 22 January 2021.

Discography

Studio albums

Extended plays

Singles

As lead artist

As featured artist

Notes

Awards and nominations

APRA Awards
The APRA Awards are presented annually from 1982 by the Australasian Performing Right Association (APRA), "honouring composers and songwriters".

|-
| rowspan="4"| 2016
| himself
|Breakthrough Songwriter of the Year
|
|-
| rowspan="3"| "Do You Remember?"
| Most Played Australian Work
| 
|-
| Pop Work of the Year
| 
|-
| Song of the Year
| 
|-

ARIA Music Awards
The ARIA Music Awards is an annual awards ceremony that recognises excellence, innovation, and achievement across all genres of Australian music. James has won one award from seven nominations.

|-
| rowspan="5"| 2015
| rowspan="5"| "Do You Remember?"
| ARIA Award for Best Male Artist
| 
|-
| ARIA Award for Best Independent Release
| 
|-
| ARIA Award for Best Pop Release
| 
|-
| ARIA Award for Song of the Year
| 
|-
| ARIA Award for Breakthrough Artist - Release
| 
|-
| rowspan="2"| 2016
| rowspan="2"| Thirty One
| ARIA Award for Best Independent Release
| 
|-
| ARIA Award for Best Adult Alternative Album
| 
|-

J Awards
The J Awards are an annual series of Australian music awards that were established by the Australian Broadcasting Corporation's youth-focused radio station Triple J. They commenced in 2005.

|-
| J Awards of 2015
| Thirty One
| Australian Album of the Year
|

Queensland Music Awards
The Queensland Music Awards (previously known as Q Song Awards) are annual awards celebrating Queensland, Australia's brightest emerging artists and established legends. They commenced in 2006.
 
|-
| 2016
| "Do You Remember"
| Highest Selling Single
| 
|-
| 2017
| himself 
| The BOQ People's Choice Award for Most Popular Male Artist
| 
|-

References

1984 births
21st-century Australian musicians
Living people
APRA Award winners
ARIA Award winners
Australian electronic musicians
Australian DJs
Australian singer-songwriters
Musicians from Brisbane
Electronic dance music DJs
21st-century Australian singers